Geisweid is a suburban part (Stadtteil) of the city Siegen in Germany.

Geisweid, a northern part of Siegen, shares borders with Sohlbach in the north, Weidenau in the south-east, Langenholdinghausen in the west and Birlenbach in the south.

The Hofbachstadion, a stadium with a capacity of nearly 10.000 spectators is located in Geisweid and hosts the home matches of the local football-club VfL Klafeld-Geisweid.

History 
Geisweid is a part of Siegen since 1. January 1975.

Population 
At the end of 2010 Geisweid had a population of 13,217 inhabitants.

Siegen